Daşkənd (also, Dashkend and Tashkend) is a village and municipality in the Yardymli Rayon of Azerbaijan.  It has a population of 1,086.

References 

Populated places in Yardimli District